Fereshteh Karimi is an Iranian women's futsal player currently playing for Azad University in Iran. She was chosen as one of the top 10 nominees for the best woman player in the world in 2013 by the futsalplanet website.

In September 2015 she won the first AFC Women's Futsal Championship playing for Iran, and was chosen as the Most Valuable Player of the tournament.

She is also participating at the second 2018 AFC Women's Futsal Championship in Thailand.

International goals

References

Living people
1989 births
Sportspeople from Tehran
Iranian women's futsal players
Iranian women's footballers
Women's association football forwards
Iran women's international footballers